is a retired Japanese professional shogi player who achieved the rank of 9-dan.

He is a former Meijin, Tenth Dan, Ōi, Kiō and Ōshō major title holder.

He has the nicknames 123 and ひふみん Hifumin given by his fans.

Katō had the record for the youngest professional player who went pro at 14 years and 7 months old until Sōta Fujii became professional in 2016 at age 14 years and 2 months.

Shogi professional

Playing style
Katō is known for playing aggressive Climbing Silver strategies. He received a Masuda Special Award in 2017 for his innovations to this strategy over his career.

Additionally, the Katō variation (加藤流 katō-ryū) of the Double Fortress opening is named after him.

Personal life
Katō was baptized as a Catholic in 1970, and his Christian name is Paul. He was made a Knight of the Order of St. Sylvester by Pope John Paul II in 1986.

Promotion history 

Katō's promotion history is as follows:
 1951: 3-kyū
 1953: 1-dan 
 1954, August 1: 4-dan
 1955, April 1: 5-dan
 1956, April 1: 6-dan
 1957, April 1: 7-dan
 1958, April 1: 8-dan
 1973, November 3: 9-dan
2017, June 20: Retired

Titles and other championships
Katō appeared in major title matches a total of twenty-four times, and won a total of eight titles. In addition to major titles, Katō won twenty-three other shogi championships during his career.

Major titles

Note: Tournaments marked with an asterisk (*) are no longer held.

Other championships

Note: Tournaments marked with an asterisk (*) are no longer held.

Awards and honors
Katō has received numerous awards and honors throughout his career for his accomplishments in both on an off the shogi board. These include the Annual Shogi Awards given out by the JSA for performance in official games and other awards given out by governmental organizations, etc. for contributions made to Japanese society.

Annual shogi awards
4th Annual Awards (April 1976March 1977): Most Games Won, Most Consecutive Games Won, Technique Award
5th Annual Awards (April 1977March 1978): Distinguished Service Award 
6th Annual Awards (April 1978March 1979): Distinguished Service Award  
8th Annual Awards (April 1980March 1981): Distinguished Service Award
9th Annual Awards (April 1981March 1982): Player of the Year, Most Consecutive Games Won
12th Annual Awards (April 1984March 1985): Most Games Won, Most Games Played
29th Annual Awards (April 2001March 2002): Tokyo Press Club Award
44th Annual Awards (April 2016March 2017): Special Award, Kōzō Masuda Award Special Prize

Other awards
1977: Shogi Honor Fighting-spirit Award (Awarded by JSA in recognition of winning 600 official games as a professional)
1978:  25 Years Service Award (Awarded by the JSA in recognition of being an active professional for twenty-five years)
1982: Shogi Honor Fighting-spirit Award (Awarded by JSA in recognition of winning 800 official games as a professional)
1986: Knight of the Order of St. Sylvester
1989: Special Shogi Honor Award (Awarded by the JSA in recognition of winning 1,000 official games as a professional)
1993: 40 Years Service Award (Awarded by the JSA in recognition of being an active professional for forty years)
2000: Medal with Purple Ribbon
2001: 1200 Wins Award (Awarded by the JSA in recognition of winning 1,200 official games as a professional)
2003: 50 Years Service Award (Awarded by the JSA in recognition of being an active professional for fifty years)
2022: Person of Cultural Merit

Notes

References

External links
ShogiHub: Professional Player Info · Kato, Hifumi
Shogi Fan: Kato Hifumi becomes the oldest shogi player

Japanese shogi players
Living people
Retired professional shogi players
Japanese television personalities
Recipients of the Medal with Purple Ribbon
Japanese Roman Catholics
Professional shogi players from Fukuoka Prefecture
People from Kama, Fukuoka
Meijin (shogi)
Tenth Dan
Ōi (shogi)
Kiō
Ōshō
Recipients of the Kōzō Masuda Award
1940 births
Recipients of the Order of the Rising Sun, 4th class
Knights of the Order of St. Sylvester
Persons of Cultural Merit